The Nord 1200 Norécrin is a French two or three-seat (later four-seat) cabin monoplane designed and built by Nord Aviation.

Development
The Norécrin was developed to meet a French ministry of transport sponsored design competition. The Norécrin is a low-wing cantilever monoplane with a retractable tricycle landing gear and the prototype (Nord 1200) was designed to receive a nose-mounted  Mathis G4-R piston engine but flew only with a  Renault 4Pei (first flight on 15 December 1945 with Georges Detre as test pilot). The production version had three-seats and was designated the Nord 1201 Norécrin I. A number of variants were produced with different engines fitted. Later variants had four-seats and the Nord 1203 Norécrin V was a two-seat military variant with machine-guns and rockets. It was a successful design and 378 aircraft were built.

Variants
1200 Norécrin
Prototype with a  Renault 4Pei engine.
1201 Norécrin I
Three-seat production variant with a  Renault 4P-01 engine (22 built)
1202 Norécrin
Prototype four-seat variant with a  Potez 4D-01 engine

1203 Norécrin II
Production variant with  Regnier 4L-00 engine.
1203 Norécrin III
Norécrin II with modified landing gear.
1203 Norécrin IV
Powered by a  Regnier 4L-02 engine.
1203 Norécrin V
Armed military variant.
1203 Norécrin VI
1955 production variant with a  Regnier 4L-14 engine.
1203 Norécrin M1
1204 Norécrin
Powered by a  Continental C125 flat-four engine.
1204/II Norécrin 
Powered by a  Continental C145-2 flat-four engine.

Operators

OMTA - One aircraft only.

Military operators

Argentine Coast Guard

French Air Force
French Navy

Israeli Air Force - Two aircraft only operated 1948–1949.

Swiss Air Force

Specifications (1203 Norécrin II)

References

 

 

1940s French civil utility aircraft
Norecrin
Single-engined tractor aircraft
Low-wing aircraft
Aircraft first flown in 1945